A societas unius personae (SUP; Latin for "single-person company") is a legal form for a single-member private limited liability company proposed by the European Commission.

See also
European corporate law
Societas Europaea
Societas cooperativa Europaea
Societas privata Europaea

External links
2014 Memo by the Commission

European Union corporate law